Jhalar Maharan is a village located in east of Ferozewattwan, Sheikhupura, in Pakistan.  The town has a population of 2000, mostly farmers.

History 
The town was named after Mahar Tribe people who moved here from Bahawalpur after a clash with The Nawabs of Land.

Peoples 
Most of the people living here belong to a farming/cattle rearing backgrounds hence they are mostly farmers and cattle rearers.

The tribes of village include MAHAR, BHATTI, WATTOO .

Administration 
The village is administered by Ferozewattwan's union council which is a subbody of Sheikhupura's Tehsil Administration. The village also has a "Kisan" Counselor.

Notes 

Villages in Sheikhupura District